Murray Donald Howell (January 29, 1909 – October 1, 1950), nicknamed "Porky", was a Major League Baseball player who played for one season. He played for the Cleveland Indians for 11 games as a pinch hitter during the 1941 Cleveland Indians season.

Career
Howell began his sports career as a minor league outfielder and batter, spending his early time with the Carrollton Frogs, before being purchased by team owner Frank Walker for the Greenville Spinners of South Carolina. He spent the 1929 and 1930 seasons with the Spinners, before moving on to other minor league endeavors, ultimately culminating in a stint on the Baltimore Orioles team, before reaching major league status with the Cleveland Indians for the 1941 season. Howell returned to the minors following his season with the Indians, serving on such teams as the Knoxville Smokies, the Jersey City Giants, and ending his career with the Atlanta Crackers.

He appeared at the plate only eleven times at the Major League level. He had two singles and four walks in his career, and struck out twice.

Personal life
Howell was married to Mary Stephens, and the two had two sons, Timothy and Don.

External links

References

1909 births
1950 deaths
Cleveland Indians players
Baseball players from Georgia (U.S. state)
Major League Baseball outfielders
Greenville Spinners players
Hartford Senators players
Toronto Maple Leafs (International League) players
Tulsa Oilers (baseball) players
Fort Worth Cats players
Birmingham Barons players
Los Angeles Angels (minor league) players
Baltimore Orioles (IL) players
Knoxville Smokies players
Jersey City Giants players
Milwaukee Brewers (minor league) players
Portsmouth Cubs players
Atlanta Crackers players
People from Travelers Rest, South Carolina